Abd al-Rahman ibn Kathīr al-Lakhmī was the penultimate Umayyad governor of Al Andalus from October 746 until January 747. He was succeeded by Yusuf ibn 'Abd al-Rahman al-Fihri.

See also
Timeline of the Muslim presence in the Iberian peninsula

References

8th-century people from al-Andalus
8th-century rulers in Europe
8th-century Arabs
Arabs in Spain
Umayyad governors of Al-Andalus